Anni Nersisyan is an Armenian professional footballer. She currently plays for Armenia women's national football team.

See also
List of Armenia women's international footballers

External links
 
 

Living people
Armenian women's footballers
Armenia women's international footballers
Year of birth missing (living people)
Women's association footballers not categorized by position